Pisa Moorings is a small town in the Central Otago District of Otago region of New Zealand's South Island. Cromwell is 9 km southwest and Wānaka is 45 km north by road.

The residential housing at Pisa Moorings is being expanded as of 2019.

Demographics
Pisa Moorings is described as a rural settlement by Statistics New Zealand.

Pisa Moorings had a population of 570 at the 2018 New Zealand census, an increase of 225 people (65.2%) since the 2013 census, and an increase of 408 people (251.9%) since the 2006 census. There were 216 households. There were 282 males and 288 females, giving a sex ratio of 0.98 males per female, with 120 people (21.1%) aged under 15 years, 75 (13.2%) aged 15 to 29, 294 (51.6%) aged 30 to 64, and 78 (13.7%) aged 65 or older.

Ethnicities were 95.8% European/Pākehā, 5.3% Māori, 2.6% Pacific peoples, 1.1% Asian, and 3.2% other ethnicities (totals add to more than 100% since people could identify with multiple ethnicities).

Although some people objected to giving their religion, 62.1% had no religion, 28.9% were Christian, 0.5% were Hindu, 0.5% were Buddhist and 1.1% had other religions.

Of those at least 15 years old, 102 (22.7%) people had a bachelor or higher degree, and 57 (12.7%) people had no formal qualifications. The employment status of those at least 15 was that 282 (62.7%) people were employed full-time, 63 (14.0%) were part-time, and 9 (2.0%) were unemployed.

References

Central Otago District
Populated places in Otago
Populated lakeshore places in New Zealand